Horatio William Barber (27 February 1843 – 27 April 1869) was an English cricketer. He was born in Broughton, near Manchester, and began to play local cricket with his hometown club in 1861. During the 1863 season, Barber played several matches for Cheshire. He also represented the Gentlemen of Manchester and the Gentlemen of Lancashire occasionally. 

Barber subsequently joined Lancashire and made his first-class debut in the match against Surrey in August 1866, scoring 4 in each innings. He played two more County matches for Lancashire the following season, against Yorkshire and Surrey, and was also selected to represent the Gentlemen of the North in July 1967. Barber appeared in his final first-class match the following month, playing for the North of England against Nottinghamshire. In the match, he achieved his highest first-class score of 20, before being bowled by George Wootton.

References

1843 births
1869 deaths
People from Broughton, Greater Manchester
English cricketers
Lancashire cricketers
Gentlemen of the North cricketers
North v South cricketers